Pathivritha is a 1979 Indian Malayalam-language film,  directed by M. S. Chakravarty. The film stars Madhu, Sheela, M. G. Soman and Padmapriya. The film has musical score by M. S. Viswanathan.

Cast
Madhu
Sheela
M. G. Soman
Padmapriya
Ravi Menon
Reena
Seema

Soundtrack
The music was composed by M. S. Viswanathan with lyrics by Bichu Thirumala.

References

External links
 

1979 films
1970s Malayalam-language films
Films scored by M. S. Viswanathan